General Hospital, Ernakulam is a state-owned hospital, with excellent super speciality facilities for training and treatment in cardiology, ctvs, nephrology, urology along with internal medicine, general surgery in Kochi, India. It is managed as part of the public health system of the government of Kerala. It was founded by the King of the Kochi princely state in 1845 and was handed over to the government of Kerala following independence of India and the following state restructuring. The working system is at par with private sector hospitals setting it a class apart. Ernakulam General Hospital is funded by the state government, and all the services are highly subsidised making it a preferred destination for patients even from Lakshadweep islands of India. Treatment for citizens classified under the Below Poverty Line category is fully subsidised. Most of the government spending on health care schemes are dispensed through the public health system, and for the area under the jurisdiction of the corporation of Kochi, the General Hospital is the prime dispensing outlet for these schemes.

References 

Hospital buildings completed in 1845
Hospitals in Kochi
1845 establishments in British India